Pratylenchus musicola is a plant pathogenic nematode infecting black walnut.

References 

musicola
Plant pathogenic nematodes
Tree diseases